Goodbye to Romance is an album by Melody Club released on April 22, 2009.

Track listing
On the Run
She's the Girl
Where Do I Belong
Girl Don't Always Want to Have Fun
Devil in You
Eighteen
The Only Ones
Do You Wanna Dance
High Society Girl
Oh Candy Call Me

Chart positions

References

Melody Club albums
2009 albums